D114 is a state road on island of Brač in Croatia connecting towns of Milna and Supetar from where Jadrolinija ferries fly to the mainland, docking in Split and the D410 state road (via D113 state road).

The road, as well as all other state roads in Croatia, is managed and maintained by Hrvatske ceste, a state-owned company.

Road junctions and populated areas

Sources

State roads in Croatia
Transport in Split-Dalmatia County
Brač